Súlnasker is a small island in the Vestmann Islands, south of Iceland.

Islands of Iceland
Vestmannaeyjar